Ross 508 is a 13th magnitude red dwarf star, 11.2183 parsecs away. The Ross catalog is named after Frank Elmore Ross who published a first list of 86 high proper motion stars in 1925.
In 2022 it was discovered to have a super-Earth, Ross 508 b, orbiting every 10.77 days, detected by doppler spectroscopy.

References

External links
 Planet Ross 508 b
 NASA visualisations

M-type main-sequence stars
Serpens (constellation)
Planetary systems with one confirmed planet
0585
508